Amelyn Esther Veloso-Zapanta (April 25, 1974 – August 24, 2017) was a Filipina broadcast journalist of CNN Philippines.

Before her death, she was the anchor of the morning show New Day, Morning Newsroom, and the public service program Serbisyo All Access. She was known for her signature trademark line, "Be Well" at the end of her programs. A co-anchor of Solar Daybreak from January 7, 2013 until 2014. she had stints with IBC-13 and TV5.

Death
On August 24, 2017, Veloso died due to liver metastasis secondary to breast cancer.

References

External links
 

Filipino television news anchors
1974 births
2017 deaths
Solar News and Current Affairs people
CNN people
IBC News and Public Affairs people
News5 people
Deaths from breast cancer
Deaths from cancer in the Philippines
People from Cebu